Macella euritiusalis is a moth of the family Erebidae first described by Francis Walker in 1859. It is known from the Cameroon, Democratic Republic of the Congo, Nigeria, Sierra Leone, Togo and from Madagascar.

The wingspan of this species is around 32–34 mm.

References

External links
 "Macella euritiusalis Berio (Noctuidae, Ophiderinae) Ht". AfricaMuseum.

Calpinae
Moths described in 1859
Moths of Madagascar
Insects of West Africa
Moths of Africa